Maharaja Jhanda Singh Dhillon (died 1774) was a Chief of Bhangi MislUnder his leadership the Dhillon family became the dominant de facto ruling power of Punjab. His father was Hari Singh Dhillon, one of the most powerful Sikh warriors of the time. He also had a warrior brother Ganda Singh Dhillon. Jhanda Singh appointed his younger brother Ganda Singh as the commander in chief of the forces. Jassa Singh Ramgarhia was one of the closest friends of Jhanda Singh.

Early life
Jhanda Singh was the eldest son of Hari Singh Dhillon after his father death he succeeded him, He raised the power and prestige of the Misl to its zenith

Military campaigns
In 1766, Jhanda Singh and Ganda Singh Dhillon at the head of strong force marched towards Multan, On the way the halted on the right bank of the satluj, Opposite Bahawalpur, Mubarik Khan the governor of Bahawalpur, he come to oppose them, Shuja Khan the governor of Multan, An indecisive battle fought between Sikhs and the Afghans, Both sides agreed to divide the territory, from Bahawalpur to Lahore equally between themselves, A treaty was signed and pakpattan from Lahore and from Bahawalpur was agreed to form boundary between them, 

In December 1766, Ahmad Shah Durrani invaded India for the eight time, Sikhs Constantly harrased him by guerila attacks, On January 1767, Ahmad Shah Durrani wrote letters to Jhanda Singh, Jassa Singh Ahluwalia, Khushal Singh, He invited to meet him and settle terms or meet him in the field, The Sikhs rejected the offer and continued their attacks, Ahmad Shah Durrani leave the India in May 1767, Jhanda Singh stayed at Amritsar and complete the fort begun by his father,

In 1771, Some Brahman of Kasur come to Amritsar and complained against sexual violence and ill treatment of Hindus, Jhanda Singh accompanied by Jassa Singh Ahluwalia, Ganda Singh, marched towards the Kasur, defeated the Pathans chief's of Kasur, and made them tributaries,

In 1772, A quarrel arose between successive governors of Multan Shujah Khan, Sharif Khan suddozai and Sharif Beg Taklu, Sharif Beg had been looking after Multan  since the days of Ahmad Shah Durrani, When Timur Shah Durrani  succeeded the Ahmad Shah Durrani , he demanded  the revenue of Multan from Sharif Beg, who got refractory and asked for help from Jhanda Singh in a return for tribute one lakh, The help was readily given, Jhanda Singh and Genda Singh marched towards Multan, The Bahawalpur forces defeated and dispersed, Muzzafar Khan son of Shuja Khan, fled away and city was occupied by the Sikhs, Multan was divided among themselves by Jhanda Singh and Lehna Singh, Diwan Singh was appointed the qiladar of Multan, Sharif Beg fled away,

See also 

 Sikh Confederacy
 Misl

References 

The Sikh Commonwealth or Rise and Fall of Sikh Misls. Edition:2001.

Year of birth missing
1774 deaths
Indian Sikhs
Jat rulers
Punjabi people
Sikh warriors